Phạm Tuyên (born January 12, 1930 in Hải Dương) is a  Vietnamese musician. He was head of the music service at Hanoi's Voice of Vietnam Radio during the Vietnam War. He is the author of many popular socialist songs, for example Như có Bác Hồ trong ngày vui đại thắng (As if there were Uncle Hồ in the great-victory happy day) and Đảng đã cho ta mùa xuân (The Communist party have given us the spring).

Biography and career
Phạm Tuyên was born on January 12, 1930, at rural commune Lương Ngọc, urban commune Bình Giang, province Hải Hưng. He is the ninth child of the very famous journalist, scholar and culture researcher Phạm Quỳnh (1892–1945) (Was executed by Viet Minh in 1945).
In 1949, Phạm Tuyên worked at  course V. Then in 1950, he was a leader of a company (in military, not an economical company) at Trường Thiếu sinh quân Việt Nam (Vietnamese School of Army child). During this period, he started to create the songs, in more detail these songs is about his military schools.

In 1954, he was appointed to undertake the literature, sport and arts at Khu học xá Trung ương (Central Dormitory) at Nam Ninh, China. Then in 1958, he came back to Vietnam and work at the Voice of Vietnam, in more detail he assumed the direction of music editor. From that time to 1975, he did create many popular songs such as Bài ca người thợ rừng (The song of lumbermen), Bài ca người thợ mỏ (The song of miners), the chorus Miền Nam anh dũng và bất khuất (The heroic and undaunted South Vietnam), Bám biển quê hương, Yêu biết mấy những con đường, Chiếc gậy Trường Sơn (The Trường Sơn stick), Gảy đàn lên hỡi người bạn Mỹ, Từ làng Sen, Đêm Cha Lo, Từ một ngã tư đường phố.

The song Như có Bác trong ngày vui đại thắng (As if there were Uncle Hồ in the great-victory happy day) was created in the night of April 28, 1975, recorded in the afternoon of April 28, 1975 and then broadcast in a special newscast at 5 p.m the same day, when North Vietnam finally conquered South Vietnam, officially ending the Vietnam War .

After 1975, he created another popular songs: Gửi nắng cho em, Con kênh ta đào, Màu cờ tôi yêu (lyric made by Diệp Minh Tuyền), Thành phố mười mùa hoa (1985, lyric made by Lệ Bình...)

The song Chiến đấu vì độc lập tự do (Fight for independence and freedom) was created in the beginning of the 1979 Sino-Vietnamese War. This song made the beginning of the music stream named "biên giới phía Bắc" (the northern border), heroizing Vietnamese soldiers who fought the Chinese. However, these songs was not put into circulation after the Sino-Vietnamese relationship was recovered.

He also wrote many songs for the children and young citizens. Some of them became very popular, such as: Tiến lên đoàn viên (March forward, the members of the Communist Youth Union), Chiếc đèn ông sao (The star-shaped lantern), Hành khúc Đội thiếu niên Tiền phong Hồ Chí Minh, Hát dưới cờ Hà Nội, Gặp nhau giữa trời thu Hà Nội, Đêm pháo hoa, Cô và mẹ (The woman teacher and the mother)...

He also wrote many articles about the musical aesthetics, about some songs and their authors, and was the initiator and director of many national musical competition such as Tiếng hát hoa phượng đỏ (The red flamboyant flowers's song), Liên hoan Văn nghệ truyền hình toàn quốc (National Television Letters and Arts Festival). He was the President of the Board of examiners of many national arts festival held by the Ministry of Culture and many various branch in the country.

Phạm Tuyên was also a commissioner of the Standing committee of the Executive board of Hội nhạc sĩ Việt Nam (Vietnamese Musician Association) from 1963 to 1983.

He retired and now he is living at Hà Nội.

Printed matter
Collection Chiếc gậy Trường Sơn (Âm nhạc Publisher, 1973); Collection Phạm Tuyên (Văn hoá Publisher, 1982); Gửi nắng cho em (Âm nhạc Publisher, 1991); Ca khúc Phạm Tuyên (Phạm Tuyên's song, a collection of 50 songs, Âm nhạc Publisher, 1994);
Audio-cassette tapes Gửi nắng cho em (Saigon Audio, 1992); Lời ru của đêm (Công ty đầu tư phát triển, Bộ văn hoá thông tin- 1993)
Music books: Các bạn trẻ hãy đến với âm nhạc (My young friends, let's come to music) (Thanh niên Publisher, 1982), Âm nhạc ở quanh ta (The music around us) (Nhà xuất bản Kim Đồng, 1987).

Notable works
36 sợi phố
Bà Còng đi chợ (đồng dao)
Bài ca người thợ mỏ
Bài ca người thợ rừng
Bài hát về Doraemon (From: Doraemon No Uta) (Japan music) (1993)
Bám biển quê hương
Bầu trời là cái túi to (From: Aoi Sora Wa Pocket Sa) (Japan music) (1993)
Bầu và bí (đồng dao)
Bầu trời xanh đẹp tuyệt vời! (From: Aozoratte Iina) (Japan song) (1993)
Biển và chúng ta (From: Umi Wa Bokura To) (Japan song) (1993)
Cái bống bình (đồng dao)
Cái cò đi đón cơn mưa (đồng dao)
Chiếc đèn ông sao
Chiếc gậy Trường Sơn (1967)
Chiến đấu vì độc lập tự do (1979)
Chúng mình là người sống trên trái đất (From: Bokutachi Chikyuujin) (Japan song) (1993)
Cô và mẹ
Con chim chích choè (đồng dao)
Con kênh ta đào
Đảng cho ta một mùa xuân
Đảng đã cho ta sáng mắt, sáng lòng
Đêm trên Cha Lo
Đêm pháo hoa
Em vào thiếu sinh quân
Gảy đàn lên hỡi người bạn Mỹ
Gánh gánh gồng gồng (đồng dao)
Gặp nhau giữa trời thu Hà Nội
Gửi nắng cho em
Hà Nội Điện Biên Phủ 
Hành khúc Đội thiếu niên Tiền phong Hồ Chí Minh
Hát dưới cờ Hà Nội
Hợp xướng miền Nam anh dũng và bất khuất
Khúc hát ru của người mẹ trẻ
Lên thăm chú cuội
Lớp học rừng (1950)
Mãi mãi là bạn bên nhau (From: Tomodachi Dakara) (Japan song) (1993)
Màu cờ tôi yêu (thơ Diệp Minh Tuyền)
Mình là Doraemon (From: Boku Doraemon) (Japan song) (1993)
Người du khách (From: Toki No Tabibito) (Japan song) (1993)
Nhớ ơn (đồng dao)
Như có Bác trong ngày đại thắng (1975)
Rềnh rềnh ràng ràng (đồng dao)
Rước đèn dưới ánh trăng
Tay đẹp (đồng dao)
Thành phố mười mùa hoa (thơ Lệ Bình) (1985)
Thiếu sinh quân ở một nơi thật vừa (1950)
Thời niên thiếu (From: Shounen Ki) (Japan song) (1993)
Tiến lên đoàn viên (1954)
Tôi không hiểu vì sao (From: Watashi Ga Fushigi) (Japan song) (1993)
Trường chúng cháu là trường mầm non
Tu hú là chú bồ các (đồng dao)
Từ làng Sen
Từ một ngã tư đường phố
Vì có bạn (From: Kimi Ga Iru Kara) (Japan song) (1993)
Vang tận trời cao (From: Ten Made Todoke) (Japan song) (1993)
Yêu biết mấy những con đường
Tiếng chuông và ngọn cờ

References

External links
Phạm Tuyên's biography on the web nhacso.net
Song collection of Phạm Tuyên
Phạm Tuyên's biography on the web họ Phạm (the Phạm clan)
7 giờ 77 ngày 7 tháng 7 năm 2007 cho 77 tuổi của Phạm Tuyên (7 o'clock, July 7th, 2007 for the 77 year-old Phạm Tuyên)

People from Hải Dương province
Vietnamese musicians
Vietnamese composers
1930 births
Living people